Nobelstadion is a stadium in Karlskoga, Sweden and is the home ground of the football team KB Karlskoga FF.

It has also been used for women's national team matches, including the UEFA Women's Euro 1997.

Football venues in Sweden
Sport in Karlskoga